The Denver and Rio Grande Western Railway Depot in Aztec, New Mexico, is located at 314 Rio Grande.  It was built in 1915 in Prairie School style.  It was listed on the National Register of Historic Places in 1985.

Railroad tracks were removed in 1968, and by 1985 the former depot was a residence.  It has gable stickwork in "the Stick Style which was so popular for early western train stations" and broad enclosed eaves perhaps suggestive of Prairie Style influence. The original concrete passenger pad serves as a patio.

References

National Register of Historic Places in San Juan County, New Mexico
Prairie School architecture
Buildings and structures completed in 1915